Vicente Fernández Pujante (born 17 September 1975 in Vilanova i la Geltrú, Barcelona, Catalonia), known simply as Vicente, is a Spanish former footballer who played as a midfielder.

References

External links

1975 births
Living people
People from Vilanova i la Geltrú
Sportspeople from the Province of Barcelona
Spanish footballers
Footballers from Catalonia
Association football midfielders
La Liga players
Segunda División players
Segunda División B players
Tercera División players
RCD Espanyol B footballers
RCD Espanyol footballers
UE Lleida players
Sporting de Gijón players
RCD Mallorca players
Girona FC players